Cool Radio 100.7 (DXDD 100.7 MHz) is an FM station owned and operated by Dan-ag sa Dakbayan Broadcasting Network, the media arm of the Archdiocese of Ozamiz. The station's studio is located at the 3rd Flr., New DXDD Bldg., Rizal Ave., Ozamiz, and its transmitter is located at St. Joseph Compound, Brgy. Tinago, Ozamiz.

The station used to air a Contemporary MOR format from the 90s until 2005, when it switched to Top 40.

References

External links
Cool Radio FB Page
Cool Radio Website

Radio stations in Misamis Occidental
Radio stations established in 1980